Oracle Fusion may refer to:

 Oracle Fusion Architecture, a standards-based technology reference blueprint for building applications
 Oracle Fusion Middleware (OFM), the middleware technology stack on which Oracle applications are built using Oracle Fusion Architecture as blueprint
 Oracle Fusion Applications (OFA), Oracle applications built on top of the Oracle Fusion Middleware technology stack using Oracle Fusion Architecture as blueprint